Dehalococcoides is a genus of bacteria within class Dehalococcoidia that obtain energy via the oxidation of hydrogen and subsequent reductive dehalogenation of halogenated organic compounds in a mode of anaerobic respiration called organohalide respiration. They are well known for their great potential to remediate halogenated ethenes and aromatics. They are the only bacteria known to transform highly chlorinated dioxins, PCBs. In addition, they are the only known bacteria to transform tetrachloroethene (perchloroethene, PCE) to ethene.

Microbiology
The first member of the genus Dehalococcoides was described in 1997 as Dehalococcoides ethenogenes strain 195 (nom. inval.). Additional Dehalococcoides members were later described as strains CBDB1, BAV1, FL2, VS, and GT. In 2012 all yet-isolated Dehalococcoides strains were summarized under the new taxonomic name D. mccartyi, with strain 195 as the type strain.

GTDB release 202 clusters the genus into three species, all labeled Dehalococcoides mccartyi in their NCBI accession.

Activities 
Dehalococcoides are obligately organohalide-respiring bacteria, meaning that they can only grow by using halogenated compounds as electron acceptors. Currently, hydrogen (H2) is often regarded as the only known electron donor to support growth of dehalococcoides bacteria.  However, studies have shown that utilizing various electron donors such as formate, and methyl viologen, have also been effective in promoting growth for various species of dehalococcoides.  In order to perform reductive dehalogenation processes, electrons are transferred from electron donors through dehydrogenases, and ultimately utilized to reduce halogenated compounds, many of which are human-synthesized chemicals acting as pollutants.  Furthermore, it has been shown that a majority of reductive dehalogenase activities lie within the extracellular and membranous components of D. ethenogenes, indicating that dechlorination processes may function semi-independently from intracellular systems.   Currently, all known dehalococcoides strains require acetate for producing cellular material, however, the underlying mechanisms are not well understood as they appear to lack fundamental enzymes that complete biosynthesis cycles found in other organisms.

Dehalococcoides can transform many highly toxic and/or persistent compounds. This includes tetrachloroethene (PCE) and trichloroethene (TCE) which are transformed to non-toxic ethene, and chlorinated dioxins, vinyl chloride, benzenes, polychlorinated biphenyls (PCBs), phenols and many other aromatic contaminants.

Applications 
Dehalococcoides can uniquely transform many highly toxic and/or persistent compounds that are not transformed by any other known bacteria, in addition to halogenated compounds that other common organohalide respirers utilize.  For example, common compounds such as chlorinated dioxins, benzenes, PCBs, phenols and many other aromatic substrates can be reduced into less harmful chemical forms.  However, dehalococcoides are currently the only known dechlorinating bacteria with the unique ability to degrade the highly recalcitrant, tetrachloroethene (PCE) and tricholoroethene (TCE) compounds into less-toxic forms that are more suitable for environmental conditions, and thus utilized in bioremediation. Their capacity to grow by using contaminants allows them to proliferate in contaminated soil or groundwater, offering promise for in situ decontamination efforts.

The process of transforming halogenated pollutants to non-toxic compounds involves different reductive enzymes. D. mccartyi strain BAV1 is able to reduce vinyl chloride, a toxic contaminant that usually originates from landfills, to ethene by using a special vinyl chloride reductase thought to be coded for by the bvcA gene. A chlorobenzene reductive dehalogenase has also been identified in the strain CBDB1.

Several companies worldwide now use Dehalococcoides-containing mixed cultures in commercial remediation efforts. In mixed cultures, other bacteria present can augment the dehalogenation process by producing metabolic products that can be used by Dehalococcoides and others involved in the degradation process. For example, Dehalococcoides sp. strain WL can work alongside Dehalobacter in a step-wise manner to degrade vinyl chloride: Dehalobacter converts 1,1,2-TCA to vinyl chloride, which is subsequently degraded by Dehalococcoides. Also, the addition of electron acceptors is needed - they are converted to hydrogen in situ by other bacteria present, which can then be used as an electron source by Dehalococcoides. MEAL (a methanol, ethanol, acetate, and lactate mixture) is documented to have been used as substrate. In the US, BAV1 was patented for the in situ reductive dechlorination of vinyl chlorides and dichloroethenes in 2007. D. mccartyi in high-density dechlorinating bioflocs have also been used in ex situ bioremediation.

Although dehalococcoides have been shown to reduce contaminants such as PCE and TCE, it appears that individual species have various dechlorinating capabilities which contributes to the degree that these compounds are reduced. This could have implications on the effects of bioremediation tactics.  For example, particular strains of dehalococcoides have shown preference to produce more soluble, carcinogenic intermediates such as 1,2–dichloroethene isomers and vinyl chloride that contrasts against bioremediation goals, primarily due to their harmful nature. 
Therefore, an important aspect of current bioremediation tactics involves the utilization of multiple dechlorinating organisms to promote symbiotic relationships within a mixed culture to ensure complete reduction to less-toxic ethene.  As a result, studies have focused upon metabolic pathways and environmental factors that regulate reductive dehalogenative processes in order to better implement dehalococcoides for bioremediation tactics.

However, not all members of Dehalococcoides can reduce all halogenated contaminants. Certain strains cannot use PCE or TCE as electron acceptors (e.g. CBDB1) and some cannot use vinyl chloride as an electron acceptor (e.g. FL2). D. mccartyi strains 195 and SFB93 are inhibited by high concentrations of acetylene (which builds up in contaminated groundwater sites as a result of TCE degradation) via changes in gene expression that likely disrupt normal electron transport chain function. When selecting Dehalococcoides strains for bioremediation use, it is important to consider their metabolic capabilities and their sensitivities to different chemicals.

Genomes
Several strains of Dehalococcoides sp. has been sequenced. They contain between 14 and 36 reductive dehalogenase homologous (rdh) operons each consisting of a gene for the active dehalogenases (rdhA) and a gene for a putative membrane anchor (rdhB). Most rdh-operons in Dehalococcoides genomes are preceded by a regulator gene, either of the marR-type (rdhR) or a two-component system (rdhST). Dehalococcoides have very small genomes of about 1.4-1.5 Mio base pairs. This is one of the smallest value for free-living organisms.

Biochemistry 
Dehalococcoides strains do not seem to encode quinones but respire with a novel protein-bound electron transport chain.

See also
 Bioaugmentation
 Bioremediation
 Biostimulation
 List of bacterial orders
 List of bacteria genera

References

External links
 
 

Bacteria genera
Bioremediation
Monotypic bacteria genera
Chloroflexota